Adolf Strauss may refer to:

 Adolf Strauss (composer) (1902–1944), Czech pianist, composer and kapellmeister
 Adolf Strauss (general) (1879–1973), German military general